Grijó may refer to the following places in Portugal:

Grijó (Macedo de Cavaleiros), a parish in Macedo de Cavaleiros
Grijó (Vila Nova de Gaia), a parish in Vila Nova de Gaia 
Grijó de Parada, a parish in Bragança